The Kabbalistic Order of the Rose-Cross ( – O.K.R.C.) was France's first ever occult society, established by Stanislas de Guaita and Joséphin Péladan in 1888. Its structure and teaching had similarities and intersections with the first Martinist Order——founded by Gérard Encausse (or better known as Papus), and has an emphasis on Christian Kabbalah as its domain of study and direction of spiritual work.

Teaching and structure 
The OKRC conducted classes on Christian Kabbalah—an esoteric form of Christianity—with the goal of revealing the hidden mystical capacity to ‘penetrate the essence of the Bible and the Divine.' Also, the order conducted examinations and awarded grades that named after the academic degrees in universities. This feature favourably distinguished the order from the bulk of the secret societies of its time.

Degrees of the O.K.R.C. 
 Bachelor of Kabbalah
 Licence of Kabbalah (Master of Kabbalah)
 Doctorate of Kabbalah

The structure of the degrees was created in the form of the University, they were awarded only to those who attend lectures and pass examinations.

Brief history 
In 1890–1891, one of the original one of the founders Joséphin Péladan abandoned the OKRC and established his own Ordre de la Rose-Croix catholique du Temple et du Graal which included many of the prominent Symbolist artists of the period. The reason for the split is that Péladan ‘refused to associate himself with Spiritism, Freemasonry or Buddhism’. Stanislas de Guaita, on the contrary, said that he doesn’t want to turn the order into a salon for artists.

After the sudden death of Stanislas de Guaita in 1897, Papus succeeded him as Grand Master of the OKRC, he was the ‘Délége General de l’Ordre kabbalistique de la Rose-Croix’ until his death in 1916.

Today, the order still operates in several countries in the world and in several languages. The French published author and spiritual teacher Jean-Louis de Biasi is the current head (as of 2019) of the Ordre Kabbalistique de la Rose-Croix. He lives in Las Vegas.

See also

References

External links 
 

Martinism
Christian Kabbalah
1888 establishments in France
Religious organizations established in 1888